Régio Francisco Congo Zalata (born June 15, 1987), better known as Mingo Bile, is an Angolan football midfielder who plays for Desportivo da Huíla.

Club career

Mingo Bile started his career at Primeiro de Agosto in 2003. In 2006, he transferred to Desportivo da Huíla to earn more game time, before returning to Primeiro de Agosto in 2008. His good performances led to an international call-up in 2010.

In 2019-20, he signed in for Desportivo da Huíla in the Angolan league, the Girabola.

International career

Mingo Bile was first called into the National Team in 2010 and has now gained 36 caps.

International goals
Scores and results list Albania's goal tally first.

References

External links

1986 births
Living people
Angolan footballers
Angola international footballers
C.D. Primeiro de Agosto players
2012 Africa Cup of Nations players
2013 Africa Cup of Nations players
People from Benguela
Association football defenders
2011 African Nations Championship players
Angola A' international footballers
2016 African Nations Championship players